Andreas Pedersen Brünniche (4 April 1704 in Roskilde – 4 November 1769 in Copenhagen) was a Danish portrait painter, active in the period called either late Baroque or early Rococo.

Biography
Andreas Brünniche was the son of Peder Jacobsen Brünniche and Anne Marensdatter. He came to Copenhagen, where he got a job with Bendix Grodtschilling the Younger and from 1737 at Johann Salomon Wahl's workshop. As his student, he was a much sought portrait painter in the capital, but also raised customers in many other provinces. He was also influenced by baroque masters such as Andreas Møller and Balthasar Denner and by rococo style under a more mature age influenced by Johan Hörner and CG Pilo. Brünniche was a skilled colorist, his ability to convincingly reproduce the tones of the sitter's skin and individualize the people portrayed made him  popular and demanded especially among the local nobility. He portrayed some of the most influential people of Denmark at the time.

On 7 June 1735, in Copenhagen, he married Margaret Hvass Thrane (17 February 1703 in Aarhus – 26 November 1762 in Copenhagen), daughter of merchant Morten Mortensen Thrane and Mette Sørensdatter Lyngbye. He fathered zoologist Morten Thrane Brünnich and painter Peter Brünniche.
 
Andreas Brünniche is buried at the Trinitatis Church.

References
 
 JP, "Andreas Brünniche", in: Merete Bodelsen and Pal Engelstoft (ed.), Weilbachs Artist Lexicon Copenhagen: Aschehoug 1947–52.
 Torben Holck Colding, "Andreas Brünniche", in: Sys Hartmann (ed.), Weilbachs Artist Encyclopedia, Copenhagen: Indiana University Press from 1994 to 2000.

1704 births
1769 deaths
18th-century Danish painters
18th-century male artists
Danish male painters
Danish Baroque painters
Danish portrait painters
People from Roskilde